Proposition 61 was a California ballot proposition that appeared on the November 8, 2016 ballot. It would have prohibited the state of California from buying any prescription drug from a drug manufacturer at price over the lowest price paid for the drug by the United States Department of Veterans Affairs. It would have exempted managed care programs funded through Medi-Cal. According to the fiscal impact statement issued by California Legislative Analyst's Office, "potential for state savings of an unknown amount depending on (1) how the measure’s implementation challenges are addressed and (2) the responses of drug manufacturers regarding the provision and pricing of their drugs."

Proposition 61 was rejected by a vote of 47 to 53 percent.

Reactions & Analysis

Supporters

Individuals 
 Bernie Sanders
 Mike Honda
 Robert Reich

Organizations 
 AIDS Healthcare Foundation
 California Nurses Association/National Nurses Organizing Committee

Parties 
 California Peace and Freedom Party
 Progressive Democrats of America

Opponents

Organizations 
 California NAACP
 California Medical Association
 Veterans of Foreign Wars, Department of California
 California Taxpayers Association

Parties 
 California Republican Party
 California Libertarian Party
 Alice B. Toklas LGBT Democratic Club

Public Opinion

Notes

References

External links 
 Yes on Prop 61
 No Prop 61

2016 California ballot propositions